Strmec pri Svetem Florijanu is a settlement in the Municipality of Rogaška Slatina in eastern Slovenia. The entire area is part of the traditional region of Styria. It is now included in the Savinja Statistical Region.

Name
The name of the settlement was changed from Strmec to Strmec pri Rogatcu (literally, 'Strmec near Rogatec') in 1953. The name was changed again to Strmec pri Svetem Florjanu (literally, 'Strmec near Saint Florian') in 1993.

Church
The local church, built on Ložno Hill north of the main settlement, is dedicated to the Virgin of Loreto and belongs to the Parish of Sveti Florijan ob Boču. It was first mentioned in written documents dating to 1765.

References

External links
Strmec pri Svetem Florijanu on Geopedia

Populated places in the Municipality of Rogaška Slatina